Michelle Chong (born 22 April 1977) is a Singaporean film, TV and digital content producer and director, writer and actress. She left the National Broadcaster Mediacorp in 2011 to set up her own media agency Left Profile and production house Huat Films. She has produced, written and directed 3 commercial movies  , the first of which, Already Famous, was chosen as Singapore’s entry for Best Foreign Film at the Academy Awards in 2013. Chong is known for her versatility and comedy in satire shows such as The Noose and more recently for her online personas Ah Lian, Venus Seow and Emily 爱美丽 etc from The Michelle Chong Channel on Youtube.

Biography 
Chong studied in CHIJ St Nicholas Girls' School, Dunman High School and Victoria Junior College where she took drama as a subject. Her drama teacher recommended her to Bates College, a top liberal arts college in Maine, USA where she studied theatre for a year. She also subsequently studied in the National University of Singapore. She was voted by FHM readers as one of the world's top 30 sexiest women in 2002 and 2003.

Chong won the Elle Actress of the Year Award (2008) and the Asian Television Awards' (ATV) Best Comedy Performance (Highly Commended) Award (2008) for her portrayal of Beh Li Choo, a butcher in the popular Peranakan dramedy, Sayang Sayang. Chong is also famous for portraying a celebrity maid, Leticia Bongnino.

In 2011, Chong took seven months of sabbatical leave to set up her own film company, Huat Films, and produced her first film as director, screenwriter and actress: Already Famous starred her, Taiwanese singer Alien Huang as well as other local celebrities who were cameo appearances in the film.

In 2012, Chong started artiste management agency Left Profile, which will manage her, Pornsak and Lee Teng.

Already Famous was selected as the Singaporean entry for the Best Foreign Language Oscar at the 85th Academy Awards, but it did not make the final shortlist.

Filmography

Variety show
1999
1999 High-Revs

2000
2000 Crimewatch

2002
Happy Rules 开心就好
Mars Vs Venus 男人女人 Oh Yeah
Open Sesame 芝麻开门客人来

2003
Bon Voyage 一路风光
Oooh! 元气大搜查
XXXtraordinary 少见多怪
Mission Possible 地球无界限

2004
Miss Singapore Universe 2004 Finals 新加坡环球小姐选美大决赛 2004
All In NETS NETS 有钱坤
New City Beat 品味动感辣辣辣
Carlsberg World of Friends 好友满天下
President’s Star Charity 2004
Eye For A Guy

2005
Fortune Festival at Giant 爱上Giant过肥年
Lunar New Year Show
Life Scent 花花都市
Be A Giant Star 2005 Giant点星光 2005
Star Choice 街头美食星
Made In Singapore 出奇制胜
The Cancer Charity Show 2005 癌过有晴天 2005
Wish You Were Here
The Sky Symphony Countdown 2006

2006
PSC Night 普威之夜
Battle of The Best 5 强中自有强中手5
My Star Guide 我的导游是明星 (season 1)
Trivio Trove 2 不说你不知 2
Life Scent 2 花花都市 2
Seoul Far Seoul Good
Rated:E
She's The One 亮丽俏佳人

2007
ChongQing Discovery 麻辣重庆
Sweets for my Sweet
Adonis Beauty Charter Box ADONIS 美丽论谈
Welcome to Taiwan 铁定台湾
PSC Night 2007 赢万金游万里 2007
The Noose season 1

2008
Lets Party With Food 5 食福满人间V
Sweets for my Sweet 2
The Noose season 2
Energy Savers 省电家族
Haircare 101 草药护发101
Haircare 101 2 草药护发101 II
F&B Heroes 餐饮英雄榜
National Day Parade 2008
New Foreigner in Town

Film

Television series

Theatre
1995
The Bald Soprano

1996
The Blue Hibiscus

1999
Love is Not Puttu Mayam
Joy Luck Club
PIE
Ah Kong’s Birthday Party

2000
Midsummer Night’s Dream 仲夏夜之梦
Travelling Light
Is This Our Stop?
Oleanna
The Theory of Everything

2001
Oleanna
The Theory of Everything

Awards

References

External links

Profile on xinmsn

1977 births
Living people
Singaporean women television presenters
Singaporean television actresses
Singaporean film directors
Singaporean women film directors
Singaporean people of Hakka descent
CHIJ Saint Nicholas Girls' School alumni
Victoria Junior College alumni
Bates College alumni
National University of Singapore alumni
Dunman High School alumni